Spanish singer Enrique Iglesias has released eleven studio albums, five compilation albums, sixty-two singles (including 8 as a featured artists), and eighty music videos. Iglesias started his career in 1995 with his first Spanish album and self-titled album Enrique Iglesias, which produced five number-ones on the Hot Latin Tracks chart and won a Grammy Award for Best Latin Pop Album in 1997. In 1999, he released his first English album Enrique, which included the song "Bailamos" from the film Wild Wild West. The album produced two number-one Billboard Hot 100 tracks. In 2001, Enrique released Escape which has sold over 8 million copies worldwide.

In July 2010, Iglesias released his ninth studio effort, Euphoria, which was his first bilingual album. The album produced three-consecutive number-ones on the Hot Dance Club Songs chart and the album was nominated for a Latin Grammy Award for Album of the Year.

He has sold over 70 million records worldwide, making him one of the best-selling Latin music artists. He has had five Billboard Hot 100 top five singles, including two number-ones and holds the record for producing 27 number-one Spanish-language singles on the Billboards Hot Latin Tracks chart.

Albums

Studio albums

Compilation albums

Singles

As lead artist

As featured artist

Promotional singles

Other charted songs

Other appearances

Music videos

Notes

References

External links 
Discography of Enrique Iglesias at EnriqueIglesias.com
[ Discography of Enrique Iglesias] at AllMusic

Iglesias, Enrique
Discographies of Spanish artists
Discography